Calvin Tomkins (born 17 December 1925) is an author and art critic for The New Yorker magazine.

Life and career
Tomkins was born in Orange, New Jersey. After graduating from Berkshire School, he attended Princeton University and received an undergraduate degree in 1948. He then became a journalist and worked for Radio Free Europe from 1953 to 1957 and for Newsweek from 1957 to 1961.

His first published contribution to The New Yorker was a fictional piece that appeared in 1958. In 1960 he joined the magazine as a staff writer. His earliest writing for the magazine consisted largely of short humor pieces. His first piece of nonfiction writing for the magazine was a profile of Jean Tinguely that appeared in 1962. In the 1960s and 1970s he became a chronicler of the New York City art scene, reporting on the development of genres and movements such as pop art, earth art, minimalism, video art, happenings, and installation art. From 1980 to 1986, he was the magazine's official art critic and his art reviews appeared in the magazine almost every week. From 1980 to 1988 he wrote the New Yorker'''s "Art World" column. As a New Yorker writer, he interviewed and wrote numerous profiles of major 20th-century figures from the art world and other fields, including Marcel Duchamp, John Cage, Robert Rauschenberg, Merce Cunningham, Buckminster Fuller, Philip Johnson, Julia Child, Georgia O'Keeffe, Leo Castelli, Frank Stella, Carmel Snow, Christo and Jeanne-Claude, Frank Gehry, Damien Hirst, Julie Mehretu, Richard Serra, Matthew Barney, David Hammons, and Jasper Johns.

Tomkins has been married four times. His first wife was Grace Lloyd Tomkins, with whom he had three children. His second and third marriages were to Judy Tomkins and Susan Cheever (with whom he had one child). His fourth and current wife is fellow writer Dodie Kazanjian, who is both a Vogue magazine contributing editor and director of Gallery Met at the Metropolitan Opera in New York City.Lives of the Artists by Calvin Tomkins; reviewed by Robert Atkins , Art in America, accessed November 12, 2010

Bibliography

 Books 
 
 
 
 
 
 
  Published in celebration of the Metropolitan Museum of Art Centennial.
  (Modern Library edition published in 1998). An enlarged version of a 1962 New Yorker profile of Gerald and Sara Murphy; tells of the lives of American expatriates in France in the years between World War I and World War II.
  (with co-author Judy Tomkins)
   
 
  (with co-author Bob Adelman)
  A republication of articles published in The New Yorker'' between 1980 and 1986.
 
  (with co-author Dodie Kazanjian)

Essays and reporting
  Profiles Andrew Bolton.
  Jasper Johns and the Foundation for Contemporary Arts.
 
  Profiles Ryan Trecartin.
 
 
———————
Notes

References 

1925 births
Living people
The New Yorker people
Princeton University alumni
Berkshire School alumni
American non-fiction writers
American art critics
People from Orange, New Jersey